Phineas Lyman (1716–1774) was a colonial American soldier known for his service in the provincial British Army of the French and Indian War. He later led a group of New England veterans of the war to settle in the new colony of West Florida where he died shortly before the outbreak of the American Revolutionary War. He earned a reputation as the most experienced colonial American officer during the war.

Early life
Lyman was born at Durham, Connecticut.  He graduated at Yale in 1738, was a tutor there until 1741, studied law and began practice at Suffield (which was then within the boundaries of Massachusetts).  In 1749 he advocated the annexation of Suffield from Massachusetts. From 1749 to 1755 he was a member of the upper chamber of the Connecticut Legislature.

French and Indian War

In March, 1755 he was appointed a major general and was made commander in chief of the Connecticut militia force of 1000 men, which participated in the unsuccessful expedition against Crown Point. At the Battle of Lake George (8 September 1755), after Sir William Johnson suffered a slight wound, Lyman took command of the forces and repulsed the attack of the French and Indians.

He was for a time in 1757 in command of Fort Edward, and in 1758 commanded the Connecticut forces in the expedition of General Abercrombie which resulted in the disastrous repulse at Ticonderoga. The following year he was with Lord Amherst at the capture of Crown Point and Ticonderoga and in 1760 took part in the expeditions to Oswego and Montreal. In 1762 he commanded the colonial contingent of Lord Albemarle's army in the capture of Havana.

Later life
In 1763, he went to England where he remained until 1772, endeavoring to obtain a grant of land for himself and other New England veterans in the newly created colony of West Florida. A tract near Natchez (now Mississippi) was granted by royal charter in 1772. Lyman led a band of settlers to the region in 1773. He died the following year and was buried near to the Big Black River in West Florida. When the American War broke out in 1775, West Florida was one of the colonies which remained loyal to the crown. In the post-war Peace of Paris it was transferred to Spanish control.

1716 births
1774 deaths
People from Durham, Connecticut
People of Connecticut in the French and Indian War
Colonial American generals
People of colonial Connecticut
Connecticut state senators
Yale College alumni
People of pre-statehood Florida
Military personnel from Connecticut
18th-century American politicians